The 1979–80 Welsh Cup was the final of the 93rd season of the main domestic football cup competition in Wales, the Welsh Cup.

Qualifying round

First round

Second round

Third round

Fourth round

Fifth round

Semi-finals

Final

First Leg

Second Leg

References
Welsh Football Data Archive: Welsh Cup Final 1979/80

1979-80
Wales
Cup